Veluwemeer Aqueduct is a  long navigable aqueduct (also known as the water bridge) located over Veluwemeer lake in Harderwijk, Netherlands. It was opened in 2002 and bypasses the N302 road.

 Where the aqueduct crosses the N302, the depth of water is three metres (9.83 feet), which allows vessels to pass over the road safely, so long as their draft is less. There are also pedestrian crossings on both sides of the waterway.

The construction of the aqueduct took some 22,000 cubic metres of concrete, plus steel sheet piling to bear the heavy weight of the water over the road and to prevent water and sediment from leaking onto the road below.

References 

2002 establishments in the Netherlands
Navigable aqueducts
Harderwijk
21st-century architecture in the Netherlands